Lars Hutten (born 18 March 1990) is a Dutch professional footballer who plays as a winger for Kozakken Boys. He formerly played for Willem II, Veendam, Excelsior, Helmond Sport, Fortuna Sittard and TOP Oss.

Club career

Early career
Hutten played as a youth for JPS in Tilburg-Noord, until joining local Eredivisie side Willem II at a young age. He was later signed by PSV at the age of 12, where he progressed through the youth system. In the 2008–09 and 2009–10 seasons, Hutten played in Jong PSV, the reserve team. On 23 September 2008, Hutten started in a KNVB Cup matchup between Jong PSV and PSV. The reserves team lost the game 0–3.

Willem II
In the summer of 2010, Hutten returned to his hometown to play for his former club, Willem II. The then newly appointed head coach Gert Heerkes had a spot left in the first team roster. In the preparation for the new season he made such a strong impression which meant that he made his debut in the Eredivisie in the first match of the 2010–11 season on 7 August 2010 against Heracles Almelo. Hutten played instead of the injured Paweł Wojciechowski and was preferred over Rowin van Zaanen. 

On 20 July 2011, during a friendly against Fortuna Sittard, Hutten broke his metatarsal bone, which meant he was sidelined for ten weeks.

Veendam
After being loaned out to SC Veendam in 2012, he signed a permanent deal with the club at the expiration of his loan deal. At the end of March 2013, Veendam went bankrupt and Hutten became a free agent as a result. He trained at FC Groningen in early April 2013 together with three other former Veendam players.

Excelsior
On 11 May 2013, it was announced that Hutten was joining Excelsior on a two-year contract. As part of that team, Hutten secured promotion to the Eredivisie in the 2013–14 season. He was loaned out to Helmond Sport for the 2014–15 season.

Fortuna Sittard and Rödinghausen
Hutten became a free agent in July 2015 and started training at Fortuna Sittard. There, he impressed and signed a contract a one-year contract in August 2015. From 2016 he played for German Regionalliga West club SV Rödinghausen, before returning to Fortuna Sittard in September 2017.

TOP Oss
On 25 June 2019, TOP Oss announced the signing of Hutten on a two-year contract.

Kozakken Boys
On 18 February 2021, it was announced that Hutten would join Kozakken Boys in the Tweede Divisie for the 2021–22 season. He made his debut on 21 August as a starter in a 1–0 away win over Quick Boys. In the following game, on 28 August, Hutten scored his first goal for the club in a 1–1 home draw against GVVV.

International career
Hutten has appeared for both the Netherlands under-19 team and under-20 team. Before, he was also a part of the under-16 and under-15 teams. He gained 14 total caps for various Dutch national youth teams.

References

External links
 Voetbal International profile 
 

Living people
1990 births
Footballers from Tilburg
Association football wingers
Dutch footballers
Netherlands youth international footballers
Willem II (football club) players
SC Veendam players
Excelsior Rotterdam players
Helmond Sport players
Fortuna Sittard players
SV Rödinghausen players
TOP Oss players
Kozakken Boys players
Eredivisie players
Eerste Divisie players
Tweede Divisie players
Regionalliga players
Dutch expatriate footballers
Dutch expatriate sportspeople in Germany
Expatriate footballers in Germany